Hope for Hong Kong was a "middle-of-the road" moderate political group founded by former Liberal Party leader James Tien who hoped to explore the moderate ground between the pro-democracy and pro-Beijing camps. It stopped operation after the delay of 2020 election and the electoral overhaul in 2021.

History
Amid the increasing polarisation of the Hong Kong politics after the 2014 Occupy protests and amid the 2019 anti-extradition protests, three moderate pro-Beijing figures "3JT", former Liberal Party leader James Tien who lost his seat on the Chinese People's Political Consultative Conference (CPPCC) because he asked for Chief Executive Leung Chun-ying to step down, former Financial Secretary John Tsang who failed to gain the Beijing government's support and lost to Carrie Lam in the 2017 Chief Executive election, and former Legislative Council President Jasper Tsang, explored the idea of forming a "middle-of-the road" political group.

The group was formed as a private company where five founders of the group were James Tien, Selina Chow, Miriam Lau, Felix Chung and Lam Man-kit, who all came from the Liberal Party, were also the company director. Tien criticised the Liberal Party leadership became too pro-Beijing and hoped for a more moderate approach. Jasper Tsang did not join the group as he was still the member of the pro-Beijing Democratic Alliance for the Betterment and Progress of Hong Kong (DAB). In June, the group sent a letter to Chairman of the Standing Committee of the National People's Congress (NPCSC) Li Zhanshu and expressed their worries over the proposed Hong Kong national security law.

Former policy director of the New People's Party Derek Yuen and former chief manager of the China Technology Corporation Jason Poon were reportedly supported by the group to run in the 2020 Legislative Council election. In the election, Yuen and Poon ran as nonpartisans and Jack Lee, former editor of Undergrad of the University of Hong Kong and editor of On Hong Kong Nationalism ran under the banner of "Hope for Hong Kong".

However, the 2020 election was delayed for a year by the authorities, followed by the overhaul of electoral system imposed by the Chinese Government in 2021. The group is regarded as "dead" as Tien said the new political situation no longer requires "key minority", the main feature of the party.

See also
Path of Democracy
Third Side
Professional Power

References

External links
Hope for Hong Kong's facebook page

Political organisations based in Hong Kong
Political parties established in 2020
2020 establishments in Hong Kong